The 2008-09 season was FC Kremin Kremenchuk's 3rd consecutive season in the Second League Group B.

Players

Squad information

Players in / out

In

Out

Squad stats

Disciplinary record

Team kit
The team kits are produced by Puma AG and the shirt sponsor is KremenchukMiaso «Кременчукм’ясо». The home and away kit was retained from previous seasons.

Club

Management

Other information

Competitions

Overall

Ukrainian Second League

Kremin's third consecutive season in Druha Liha began on 20 July 2008 and ended on 13 June 2009. Kremin finished 14th.

Classification

Results summary

Results by round

Matches
All kickoff times are in EEST.

Ukrainian Cup

First preliminary round

Second preliminary round

Disciplinary record

References

External links
 FC Kremin Kremenchuk official website

FC Kremin Kremenchuk seasons
Kremin Kremenchuk